South Carolina Highway 173 (SC 173) is a  primary state highway in the U.S. state of South Carolina. It serves to connect the town of Ridgeville with U.S. Route 78 (US 78). It is known as School Street for its entire length.

Route description
SC 173 is a two-lane rural highway that connect the town of Ridgeville northeast to US 78. The predominant features along the route are homes and forest.

History
Established as the second SC 173 in 1940, it traversed from US 15 in Grover east to US 78 near Ridgeville; the section between Ridgeville and US 78 was originally part of SC 27.  In 1941 or 1942, it was extended east to SC 31 (current US 176), with an incomplete gap at the Dorchester-Berkeley county line.  In 1948, SC 173 was reduced to its current alignment; leaving behind Wire Road/Ridge Road (S-18-19) and Cypress Campground Road (S-8-32).

The first SC 173 was established in 1937 or 1938 as a new primary routing from SC 27, in Ridgeville, north to US 78/SC 2.  In 1940, SC 173 and SC 27 switched places.

Major intersections

See also

References

External links

 
 SC 173 at Virginia Highways' South Carolina Highways Annex

173
Transportation in Dorchester County, South Carolina